American Baptist may refer to:

 American Baptist Churches USA (ABCUSA), formed (as the Northern Baptist Convention) in 1907
 American Baptist Association, formed 1924
 American Baptist College, Nashville, Tennessee, formed 1924 by the National Baptist Convention, USA
 American Baptist International Ministries, a missionary society
 Any Baptist who is an American: Baptists in the United States

See also
 Southern Baptist Convention, formed after schism from the American Baptist Churches